The 1966–68 Liga Bet season saw Hapoel Kiryat Shmona,  Maccabi Herzliya, Hapoel Yehud and Hapoel Sderot win their regional divisions and promoted to Liga Alef.

North Division A

A.S. Kiryat Bialik withdrew from the league and folded.

North Division B

South Division A

South Division B

Elite Ramat Gan withdrew from the league.

See also
1966–68 Liga Leumit
1966–68 Liga Alef

References
Done, but not finished Maariv, 16.6.68, Historical Jewish Press 
Liga Bet tables Davar, 17.6.68, Historical Jewish Press 
Postponed matches Maariv, 23.6.68, Historical Jewish Press 
"End of race" in Sderot Maariv, 14.7.68, Historical Jewish Press 

Liga Bet seasons
Israel
3
Israel
3